Salman Hazazi (born 1 January 1992) is a Saudi Arabian footballer who plays as a right back.

External links 
 

1992 births
Living people
Al-Qadsiah FC players
Al-Raed FC players
Khaleej FC players
Ettifaq FC players
Al-Jabalain FC players
Al-Noor FC players
Saudi Arabian footballers
Saudi First Division League players
Saudi Professional League players
Saudi Third Division players
Saudi Fourth Division players
Association football fullbacks